Maurice Barry (December 31, 1880 – May 15, 1967) was an American gymnast. He competed in three events at the 1904 Summer Olympics.

References

1880 births
1967 deaths
American male artistic gymnasts
Olympic gymnasts of the United States
Gymnasts at the 1904 Summer Olympics
Sportspeople from Indianapolis